Khaled Omr Zaki Mohamed Abdalla is an Egyptian freestyle wrestler. At the African Wrestling Championships, he won the gold medal both in 2018 and 2019 in the men's freestyle 125 kg event.

In 2019, he represented Egypt at the African Games held in Rabat, Morocco and he won the gold medal in the men's freestyle 125 kg event.

Major results

References

External links 
 

Living people
Year of birth missing (living people)
Place of birth missing (living people)
Egyptian male sport wrestlers
African Games gold medalists for Egypt
African Games medalists in wrestling
Competitors at the 2019 African Games
African Wrestling Championships medalists
21st-century Egyptian people